Abel Loulou Yao Tebily (born 14 February 1983) is an Ivorian footballer who plays for R.O.C. de Charleroi-Marchienne in Belgium as a midfielder.

Career 
He began his career with Académie JMG, before moving in 2003 to Toumodi FC. In July 2006 he joined Belgium club R.O.C. de Charleroi-Marchienne. He left R.O.C. de Charleroi-Marchienne in July 2008 and spent a half-year on loan to KAS Eupen, before returning to R.O.C. in January 2009.

References

1983 births
Living people
Ivorian footballers
Association football midfielders
Ivorian expatriates in Belgium
R. Olympic Charleroi Châtelet Farciennes players
Toumodi FC players
Footballers from Abidjan